Nyssodrysternum cingillum is a species of beetle in the family Cerambycidae. It was described by Monne in 2009.

References

Nyssodrysternum
Beetles described in 2009